Andrea Alciato, or Alciati (1492–1550) (Andreas Alciatus), Italian jurist
 Dr. Gian Paolo Alciati della Motta (1515–1573) Italian Calvinist
 Francesco Alciati (1522–1580), Italian Cardinal
 Enrique Alciati (died after 1912), French-Italian sculptor

Italian-language surnames